The Mençuna Cup is a tournament for professional female tennis players played on outdoor hard courts. The event is classified as a $60,000 ITF Women's Circuit tournament and has been held in Artvin, Turkey, since 2017.

Past finals

Singles

Doubles

External links 
 ITF search

 
ITF Women's World Tennis Tour
Hard court tennis tournaments
Tennis tournaments in Turkey
Recurring sporting events established in 2017
2017 establishments in Turkey